Eumysia maidella is a species of snout moth in the genus Eumysia. It was described by Harrison Gray Dyar Jr. in 1905. It is found in California, United States.

References

Moths described in 1905
Phycitinae